Little John A Begging is Child ballad 142 and about Robin Hood.  It exists in two variants, one fragmentary.

Synopsis
In one variant, Robin Hood sends Little John out, disguised as a beggar.  In the fragmentary one, Little John apparently exchanges clothing with a beggar, as the surviving ballads opens with his complaint that they do not fit.  In both variants, he meets up with beggars who realize that he is not one of their company.  They fight, and Little John wins.

The fragmented version breaks off there, but in the complete one, Little John discovers they were carrying a great deal of money and takes it.

Adaptations
Howard Pyle, in his The Merry Adventures of Robin Hood, transferred this adventure to Robin.

External links
Little John A Begging, both variants
Little John A Begging, with commentary

Notes

Child Ballads
Robin Hood ballads